Jossa is a river of Hesse, Germany. It flows into the Lüder near Hosenfeld.

See also
List of rivers of Hesse

References

Rivers of Hesse
East Hesse
Rivers of the Vogelsberg
Rivers of Germany